Swain (12 February 1992  – 27 July 2022) was an Irish-bred Thoroughbred racehorse and sire. He is one of only three horses to win two editions of Britain's premier weight-for-age race, the King George VI and Queen Elizabeth Stakes.

Background
Swain was a bay horse with a white star and snip and white socks on his hind legs bred in Ireland by his owner Sheikh Mohammed. He was one of the best horses sired by Nashwan, the 1989 Epsom Derby winner. Swain's dam, Love Smitten was a successful Canadian-bred racemare whose wins included the Grade I Apple Blossom Handicap. The colt was originally sent into training in France with André Fabre.

Racing career
Swain began his racing career in France in 1995 when he won his first five races including the Group Three Prix du Lys, the Listed Prix Reux and the Grand Prix de Deauville. On his final race of the season he started 11/5 second favourite as part of Sheikh Mohammed's entry for the Prix de l'Arc de Triomphe. He finished third of the sixteen runners, beaten three-quarters of a length and two lengths behind Lammtarra and Freedom Cry.

At four, he was finished third in the Prix Ganay before being sent to England where he recorded his first success at Group One level when beating Singspiel by  a neck in the Coronation Cup. He then finished second to Helissio in the 1996 Grand Prix de Saint-Cloud, and defeated Pentire in the  Prix Foy. He finished fourth in his second attempt at the Prix de l'Arc de Triomphe before being shipped to North America for the 1996 Breeders' Cup Turf at Woodbine Racetrack: Swain finished third behind Pilsudski and Singspiel. At the end of the 1996 season, Swain was transferred to his owners Godolphin organisation and entered the stable of Saeed bin Suroor.

At age five in 1997, Swain defeated both Pilsudski and Helissio to win the 1997 King George VI and Queen Elizabeth Stakes. He returned in 1998 to repeat as the winner, making him (at age six) the oldest horse to win the King George VI and Queen Elizabeth Stakes and the first back-to-back winner since Dahlia in 1973–74. He also won the 1998 Irish Champion Stakes, but finished second in that year's Coronation Cup and second to Silver Charm in the Dubai World Cup. Sent to Churchill Downs in Louisville, Kentucky for the 1998 Breeders' Cup Classic, Swain wound up his racing career with a third-place finish to Awesome Again and Silver Charm.

After earning $3,797,566 in racing, Swain was retired to stud duty.

Progeny

Swain retired to stand stud at Shadwell's Kentucky farm in 1999 before being relocated to Ascot Stud, Ontario in 2013. Swain was not a success as a stallion: during his time at stud in Canada his stud fee fell from $35,000 to $4,000. He sired 13 stakes winners including:
 Dimitrova (Flower Bowl Invitational Stakes) Gr-1.
 Nasheej (May Hill Stakes) Gr-2.
 Muqbil (Greenham Stakes) Gr-3.

Swain was pensioned from stud duty in October 2011 and was returned to Shadwell in Kentucky. Swain's last standing fee was CA$3,500. In 2022, he was relocated to Old Friends Equine as part of a downsizing program following the death of Shadwell owner  Sheikh Hamdan bin Rashid Al Maktoum. 

He was euthanized on 27 July 2022 due to the infirmities of old age.

Pedigree

References

External links
 Swain at Shadwell Farm LLC
 Ascotstudfarm.com, where Swain is standing at stud

1992 racehorse births
Racehorses bred in Ireland
Racehorses trained in France
Racehorses trained in the United Kingdom
Cartier Award winners
Thoroughbred family 14-c
King George VI and Queen Elizabeth Stakes winners
2022 racehorse deaths